Erika de Casier is a Portuguese-born Danish singer, songwriter, and record producer. She began her career performing as half of the R&B duo Saint Cava. After the duo disbanded, she independently released her debut studio album, Essentials, in 2019. She signed to British record label 4AD in 2020, and released her second studio album, Sensational, in 2021.

Early life
Erika de Casier was born in 1989 or 1990 in Portugal to a Belgian mother and Cape Verdean father. She attended Catholic school until 1998 when, at age eight, she and her family moved to Denmark. She mostly grew up around her mother. She was unable to speak Danish when her family first moved, and was bullied at school due to her and her brother being the only mixed race students. She spent time painting and watching MTV throughout her adolescence. At age 16, she spent a year living with a host family in the United States. Upon returning to Denmark, she joined her school's choir and band and began producing her own beats. After graduating from school, she moved to Copenhagen. Before performing as a solo artist, she worked at a kindergarten.

Career

2014–2019: Saint Cava and Essentials
Starting in 2014, Casier performed with Andreas Vasegaard as part of the R&B duo Saint Cava. The duo performed at the Roskilde Festival in 2015 and released a string of singles through Danish record label Forbandet Ungdom before eventually disbanding. During this time, she also worked with the Danish electronic collective Regelbau after meeting Natal Zaks, a member of Regelbau, in Aarhus.

In 2017, Casier released her debut single as an independent artist, "What U Wanna Do?", and released her second single, "Intimate", the following year. She released her debut studio album, Essentials, on 16 May 2019 through her own label, Independent Jeep Records, which spawned the two prior singles as well as the singles "Good Time" and "Do My Thing". Essentials was well received by critics, and appeared on several lists of the best albums of the year from publications including Vice, Crack Magazine, and Gorilla vs. Bear, which also named Essentials as one of the best albums of the 2010s.

2020–present: Sensational
During the beginning of the COVID-19 pandemic, Casier experienced writer's block, but was later inspired by the pandemic and the Black Lives Matter movement to begin writing her second studio album, Sensational. Casier worked heavily with producer Natal Zaks, under the moniker El Trick, on the album, writing and producing demos for each song independently before working with Zaks to complete them. Her April 2020 remix of English singer Dua Lipa's single "Physical" appeared on the remix EP for the song after Lipa reached out to Casier. She performed a set for Boiler Room's Streaming from Isolation series in May 2020. In October 2020, she signed to UK record label 4AD and released her first single with the label, "No Butterflies, No Nothing", which also served as the lead single from Sensational, with a music video. The Fader named the single as one of the best songs of 2020. 

In March 2021, Casier released her second single from Sensational, "Drama". Casier announced the title of Sensational and its scheduled release date, and released her third single from the album, "Polite", in April 2021. The fourth single from the album, "Busy", was released in May 2021. Sensational was released on 21 May 2021 through 4AD. It was described by Mixmags Patrick Hinton as "bolder and more assertive" than her debut album. In November 2021, she released The Sensational Remixes, a remix album of Sensational.

Artistry
Casier's music is mostly pop, contemporary R&B, and experimental pop, and has taken inspiration from music of the 1990s and early 2000s, incorporating genres such as g-funk, bossa nova, breakbeat, and trip hop. She has listed Avril Lavigne's 2002 album Let Go, Brandy and Monica's 1998 song "The Boy Is Mine", Craig David's 2000 album Born to Do It, and Aaliyah's 2001 self-titled album as influences on her music. She has cited Sade and Destiny's Child as groups that shaped her sound, while stating that Portishead, Tricky, and Mariah Carey influenced her vocals. She sings, writes, and produces much of her music. For Sensational, she developed an alter ego, the "fabulous", "Hausfrauen" Bianka.

Personal life
In 2021, Casier earned a master's degree in Music Creation from the Rhythmic Music Conservatory, and presented parts of Sensational as her final project. She has described herself as "not a spiritual person at all".

Discography

Studio albums

Remix albums

Singles

Guest appearances

Remixes

Notes

References

21st-century Danish women singers
Contemporary R&B singers
4AD artists
Danish people of Belgian descent
Danish people of Cape Verdean descent
Danish  women singer-songwriters
Danish pop singers
English-language singers from Denmark
Living people
1990 births
Portuguese emigrants to Denmark
Portuguese people of Cape Verdean descent 
Portuguese people of Belgian descent